Mirror of Holland is a 1950 short Dutch documentary film about The Netherlands, directed by Bert Haanstra. It was Haanstra's first success abroad and won the Short Film Palme d'Or at the 1951 Cannes Film Festival.

References

External links

1950 films
1950s Dutch-language films
1950s short documentary films
Dutch black-and-white films
Films directed by Bert Haanstra
Short Film Palme d'Or winners
1950 documentary films
Dutch short documentary films
Documentary films about the Netherlands
1950 short films